Valerian Bernard Freyberg, 3rd Baron Freyberg (born 15 December 1970), is a British peer, sitting as a crossbencher.

The son of the 2nd Baron Freyberg and Ivry Perronelle Katharine, he was educated at Camberwell College of Arts, where he graduated with a Bachelor of Arts in 1994. He succeeded to his father's title one year previously, in 1993. He is one of the 92 hereditary peers elected to sit in the House of Lords after the House of Lords Act 1999.

References

1970 births
Barons in the Peerage of the United Kingdom
Living people
British conceptual artists
English artists
Alumni of the Slade School of Fine Art
Crossbench hereditary peers
Hereditary peers elected under the House of Lords Act 1999